EKS ( meaning Integrated Cosmos System ) Kupol ( meaning Dome) is a developing programme of Russian early warning satellites as a replacement for the US-KMO and US-K satellites of the Oko programme. The satellites are designed to identify any possible future ballistic missile launches, from outer space, and complement early warning radars such as the Voronezh. This gives advance notice of a nuclear attack and would provide information to the A-135 missile defence system which protects Moscow, as well as other Russian missile defense and counterattack resources. Six satellites are planned to be initially orbited.

Background
EKS has been designated to detect and track ballistic missiles launched towards Russia or its allies. The systems have been designed as a replacement for the current system of early warning satellites called Oko, which had its first launch in 1972  and was described in 2005 as "hopelessly outdated". Oko has two types of satellites: US-KMO are in geosynchronous orbits and have an infrared telescope to identify ballistic missile launches. US-K are in Molniya orbits and are an earlier model with optical telescopes and infrared sensors. The Oko system has two control centres with the main one being Serpukhov-15 outside Moscow.

Oko is part of the Main Centre for Missile Attack Warning which is under the Space Command (KK) of the Russian Aerospace Defence Forces.

In 2014, Kommersant published that the first satellite, of a type named Tundra, would be launched in 2014. According to that report they would operate on highly elliptical orbits. The satellite was not launched in 2014, however. It was eventually launched from the Plesetsk Cosmodrome on 17 November 2015, using a Soyuz 2.1b rocket with a Fregat stage, under the name EKS-1 / Tundra-11L. (GRAU designation: 14F142) In November 2022, the sixth satellite was orbited.

Timeline
Information on the new EKS system is scarce but it appears that it was designed by Energia Corp in 1999-2000 and was selected against a proposal from Oko manufacturer NPO Lavochkin. The Russian Ministry of Defence awarded the contract to Energia in 2007 with an expected delivery date of 2008, for a test launch in 2009. In 2009, it was reported to be delayed until late 2011/early 2012. In 2011, the Russian MoD sued Energia for the delay, claiming that a contract extension issued until May 2010 was invalid and asking for 262 million rubles in compensation. According to news reports Energia said that the contract extension was valid and that the problem was with their subcontractors. In addition, they said that the Russian MoD kept changing the specification and demanding things that were beyond the capabilities of the industry. The Russian MoD lost the court case. Energia delivered a satellite in 2009 but as of April 2012 there had not been a test launch.

In April 2012, the minister Alexander Sukhorukov announced that a contract had been signed to manufacture these satellites and that there would be a launch later in 2012. The last satellites of the previous Oko system were Kosmos 2479, launched on 30 March 2012, and Kosmos 2469, launched on 30 September 2010.

The first EKS satellite (Kosmos 2510, EKS-1, Tundra 11L) was eventually launched from Plesetsk on 17 November 2015 using a Soyuz-2.1b rocket and  there were four in service which is the minimum standard strength. A fifth one was launched in November 2021 to start the expansion of the system capabilities. In November 2022, the initial constellation of six satellites was completed.

Satellites

References

Sources
Bart Hendrick (Monday, February 8, 2021) EKS: Russia’s space-based missile early warning system the Space Review
definition of the word: cosmos Cambridge University Dictionary Online

External links
 The EKS system at Anatoly Zak's Russian Space Web

Early warning satellites
Early warning systems
Military satellites of Russia
Satellites using the USP bus
Spacecraft launched by Soyuz-2 rockets
Military equipment introduced in the 2010s